The South Asian Journal of Business and Management Cases is a peer reviewed academic journal that provides a space for high quality original teaching cases, research or analytical cases, evidence-based case studies, comparative studies on industry sectors, products, and practical applications of management concepts.

The journal is published twice a year by SAGE Publications (New Delhi) in collaboration with Birla Institute of Management Technology

This journal is a member of the Committee on Publication Ethics (COPE).

Abstracting and indexing 
Journal of Creative Communications is abstracted and indexed in:
 DeepDyve
 Dutch-KB
 J-Gate

External links 
 
 Homepage

References 

 http://publicationethics.org/members/south-asian-journal-business-and-management-cases=COPE
 http://bimtech.ac.in/research/journal-and-publications/south-asian-journal-of-business-and-management-cases/

SAGE Publishing academic journals
Publications established in 2012
Business and management journals